The Miss Washington World competition is a beauty pageant that selects the representative for Washington in the Miss World America pageant.

The current Miss Washington World is Shree Saini of Ellensburg.

Winners 
Color key

Notes to table

References

Washington (state) culture
Women in Washington (state)
1951 establishments in Washington (state)
Recurring events established in 1951